Peavy may refer to:

People named:
 Jake Peavy, an American baseball player.
 Nathan Peavy, an American basketball player.
 Paulina Peavy, an American artist.
 Peavy Wagner, a German heavy metal  musician. 

In forestry:
 Peavy Arboretum, an arboretum in Oregon, United States.

See also
 Peavey (disambiguation)